Ivo Puhonny (19 July 1876 – 6 February 1940) was a German graphic artist and puppeteer, son of the landscape painter Victor Puhonny. Puhonny is known primarily for his advertising art in the Sachplakat style, and the creation of the Baden-Baden Puppet Theater in 1911.

Life and work

Graphics
Puhonny studied at the Art Academy in Karlsruhe, and was influenced by the work of Henri de Toulouse-Lautrec. Involved in the poster art movement of the early 20th century, Phuonny created advertisements for products such as margarine (for Schlinck & Co.) and cigarettes (Batschari). He also illustrated books and created etchings and lithographs. His graphics work is preserved in the Museum of Arts and Crafts in Hamburg and the Gallica Bibliothèque Numérique of the Bibliothèque nationale de France.

Puppetry
In 1911 he founded the Baden-Baden Künstler-Marionettentheater, dedicated to puppet performances. Puhonny and his wife carved and clothed the puppets and designed the stages for the plays. The theatre was based in Baden-Baden during the winter, and went on tour during the summers. Many of his puppet dolls are displayed in the collection of the Munich City Archives and the Staatliche Kunstsammlungen Dresden.

Personal life

Puhonny married his school sweetheart Lisa, with whom he had two daughters, Eva and Doris. His home in Baden-Baden was a gathering place for important artists of the time, including Else Lasker-Schüler, Otto Flake, Klabund and Carl Sternheim. Puhonny was prone to depression because of his experiences during World War I, and the emergence of Nazism affected him due to his foreign-sounding name and the socially critical nature of his work, which became increasingly sidelined after World War II began. His circle of friends and acquaintances included Jews whose emigration, deportation and suicides exacerbated his depression. Suffering from a nervous disorder, he died at a sanatorium in Stuttgart following a stroke.

Notes

Bibliography

Further reading
 
 
 

Material below compiled from

External links

 Ivo Puhonny marionette collection Staatliche Kunstsammlungen Dresden (in German)

German puppeteers
People from Baden-Baden
1876 births
1940 deaths
German graphic designers
Artists from Bavaria